Goalball at the 2018 Asian Para Games in Jakarta took place between 7 and 12 October 2018.

Medalists

Results
Detail Results :

Men

Group 1

Group 2

Final Round

Semi-finals

Bronze Medal Match

Gold Medal Match

Women

Ranking Round

Final Round

Semi-finals

Bronze Medal Match

Gold Medal Match

References

See also
Goalball at the 2017 ASEAN Para Games

External links
 Goalball - Asian Para Games 2018
 RESULT SYSTEM - ASIAN PARA GAMES JAKARTA 2018

2018 Asian Para Games events